Lee Dickson (born 29 March 1985 in Verden, Germany) is an English professional rugby union player who plays  at scrum-half for Bedford Blues in the RFU Championship. Dickson played 49 times for Newcastle Falcons between 2004–2008 and 256 games for Northampton Saints between 2008–17.  He played for the  national side 18 times between 2012–14.

Personal Business
Dickson is 1/4 owners of OUTOFTHESCRUM with brother Karl and Harlequins player Ross Chisholm. OUTOFTHESCRUM was Launched on 19 June 2019.

Background
Dickson was educated at Barnard Castle School where he learnt his rugby. His first club was Newcastle Falcons where he made his debut for first team in the 2004-05 Zurich Premiership season.

Born in Germany to an English mother and Scottish father, Dickson represented Scotland at the 2004 Under-19 World Cup before switching his international allegiance to England and being part of their Under-21 World Cup campaign a year later.

Dickon's older brother Karl Dickson is also a former professional rugby union player for Harlequins and England.

Dickson lives in Langton, County Durham.

Club career
Dickson spent four seasons at Newcastle Falcons and made 41 appearances for the north east club before moving to newly promoted Northampton Saints ahead of the 2008-09 Guinness Premiership season. He was a try scorer as Northampton Saints won the LV= Cup for the first time in 2010, and showed his hunger for the big games by going over the whitewash in the 2013 Aviva Premiership final. In 2014 Dickson played as a replacement as Northampton beat Saracens to win the Premiership. The scrum half was named as the club captain for the 2015-16 season, replacing Dylan Hartley. Tom Wood took over the captaincy for the 2016-17 campaign, however. On 6 April 2017 it was announced that Dickson would join Bedford Blues as player-coach for the 2017-18 Greene King IPA Championship season. Lee retired from professional rugby at the end of the 2018-19 season, following a colourful 15-year career. He is currently the Master in Charge of Rugby at Barnard Castle School, citing the new position as a 'dream come true'.

International career
In 2008, Dickson played for England Saxons in the side that defeated Ireland A. He was also called up to the England squad for the 2008 Six Nations Championship.

In 2012, Dickson made his debut for the full national team off the bench in England's 6 Nations match with Scotland, in which England won 13-6 and retained the Calcutta Cup. Subsequently, the England scrum half played four of the five games on the South African tour in June 2012. His last appearance in the England jersey is when he played against the All Blacks during the 3-test series in summer 2014. Dickson has since earned 18 caps for England.

References

External links
Northampton Saints Profile

1985 births
Living people
English rugby union players
Rugby union scrum-halves
Newcastle Falcons players
People educated at Barnard Castle School
English people of Scottish descent
England international rugby union players
People from Spratton
Northampton Saints players
Bedford Blues players